Balaclava Junction is the only extant grand union in Australia. Located at the intersection of Balaclava Road and Hawthorn Road, Caulfield North on the Melbourne tram network, trams can go in all directions from all directions.

It is the only surviving example of a grand union in the southern hemisphere. Adelaide previously had three grand unions, but none exist today. 

Balaclava Junction dates from November 1913, originally being built by the Prahran & Malvern Tramways Trust, at the time it was the most complex junction on the network. It has been rebuilt a number of times since opening, most recently in 2005 by Yarra Trams.

Tram routes 3/3a, 16, and 64 all travel through Balaclava Junction.

References

External links

Trams in Melbourne
Transport in the City of Glen Eira
Road junctions in Australia
Rail infrastructure in Victoria (Australia)
1913 establishments in Australia